Hendricus Adriaan Henk Pellikaan (10 November 1910 – 24 July 1999) was a Dutch football midfielder who played for Netherlands in the 1934 FIFA World Cup. He also played for Longa Tilburg.

References

External links
 FIFA profile

1910 births
1999 deaths
Dutch footballers
Netherlands international footballers
Association football midfielders
Longa Tilburg players
1934 FIFA World Cup players
People from Leerdam
Footballers from Utrecht (province)
20th-century Dutch people